The following is a list of the Dead Sea Scrolls from the cave 5 near Qumran.

Description
Wadi Qumran Cave 5 was discovered alongside Cave 6 in 1952, shortly after the discovery of Cave 4. Cave 5 produced approximately 25 manuscripts.

List of manuscripts
Some resources for more complete information on the Dead Sea Scrolls are the book by Emanuel Tov, "Revised Lists of the Texts from the Judaean Desert" for a complete list of all of the Dead Sea Scroll texts, as well as the online webpages for the Shrine of the Book and the Leon Levy Collection, both of which present photographs and images of the scrolls and fragments themselves for closer study.  Information is not always comprehensive, as content for many scrolls has not yet been fully published.
{|class="wikitable"
|-
! Fragment or Scroll Identifier
! Fragment or Scroll Name
!Alternative Identifier
! English Bible Association
! Language
!Date/Script
! Description
! Reference
|-
! colspan="8" style="background:#b8c7d6;"|
Qumran Cave 5
|-
| 5QDeut
|Deuteronomy
|5Q1||  Deuteronomy 7:15–24; 8:5–9:2
||Hebrew
|Early Hellenistic|| || 
|-
|5QKgs||Kings
|5Q2||  1 Kings 1:1,16–17,27–37
||Hebrew
|Hasmonean|| ||
|-
|5QIsa|| Isaiah
|5Q3||  Isaiah 40:16,18–19
||Hebrew
|Herodian|| ||
|-
|5QAmos||Amos
|5Q4||  Amos 1:2–5
||Hebrew
||| ||
|-
|5QPs||Psalms
|5Q5||  Psalm 119:99–101,104,113–20,138–42
||Hebrew
|Herodian|| ||
|-
| 5QLama
|rowspan=2|Lamentations
|5Q6||  Lamentations 4:5–8,11–16,19–22; 5:1–13,16–17
||Hebrew
|Herodian|| ||
|-
| 5QLamb
|5Q7||  Lamentations 4:17–20
||Hebrew
|Herodian|| ||
|-
| 5QPhyl
|Phylactery
|5Q8||  || Hebrew
|Hellenistic-Roman|| Phylactery in its unopened case
|
|-
| 5QapocrJosh or 5QToponyms
| Toponyms
|5Q9||  ||Hebrew
|Herodian || Seven fragments with names of places 
||
|-
| 5QapocrMal
|Apocryphon of Malachi
|5Q10||  ||Hebrew
|Hellenistic-Roman|| Apocryphon of Malachi
||
|-
| 5QS
|| Rule of Community (Serek ha-Yahad)
|5Q11
||  ||Hebrew
|Herodian|| ||
|-
| 5QD
||Damascus Document
|5Q12||  ||Hebrew
|Herodian|| Damascus Document
||
|-
|5QRule or 5QRégle
|Rule of Community
|5Q13
|
|Hebrew
|Hellenistic-Roman
|Fragments related to 1QS
|
|-
|5QCurses
|Curses
|5Q14
|
|Hebrew
|Herodian
|Liturgical compositions with curses
|
|-
|5QNJ
|New Jerusalem Scroll
|5Q15
|
|Aramaic
|Hellenistic-Roman
|Description of the New Jerusalem
|
|-
|5QUnid
|Unidentified
|5Q16–5Q24
|
|Hebrew
|Hellenistic-Roman
|Unidentified fragments
|
|-
|5QUnc
|Unclassified
|5Q25
|
|Hebrew
|Hellenistic-Roman
|Unclassified fragments 
|
|}

See also 
 Biblical manuscripts
 Septuagint manuscripts
 List of Hebrew Bible manuscripts

References

Bibliography

External links
 A Catalog of Biblical Passages in the Dead Sea Scrolls by David Washburn, 2002
 Textual Criticism: Recovering the Text of the Hebrew Bible by Peter Kyle McCarter, 1986

Dead Sea Scrolls